William Jensen "Billy" Cottrell (born 1980) is a former Ph.D. candidate at the California Institute of Technology who was convicted in April 2005 of conspiracy associated with the destruction of eight sport utility vehicles and a Hummer dealership in the name of the Earth Liberation Front (ELF). He was sentenced to eight years in federal prison on conspiracy charges and ordered to pay $3.5 million in restitution. He was released August 16, 2011.

Early life

Cottrell graduated from the University of Chicago in 2002 as a double major in physics and mathematics. He also competed on the school's Division III cross country team, where he was often called the "team genius". After graduating, he was accepted to the graduate physics program at Caltech, where he would meet Tyler Johnson, who was also studying physics and finishing up his undergraduate work.

Summer 2003 and SUV arsons

In August 2003, Cottrell and Tyler Johnson developed a plan to place bumper stickers on SUVs reading "SUV = TERRORISM."  In a series of emails that were later recovered by the FBI, Cottrell attempted to recruit friends to help him purchase the bumper stickers, and organised arson attacks on a series of Hummer dealers.

Trial
He was arrested in March 2004 after law enforcement tracked him sending emails to the Los Angeles Times. The e-mails signed by "Tony Marsden" speak about what the ELF cell had done, vandalizing more than 130 SUVs parked at dealerships or residential homes, claiming they were damaging the environment. He was charged with conspiracy to commit arson, arson, and one count of using a destructive device during a crime of violence, in an October 24, 2004 Federal grand jury indictment. Cottrell's lawyers stated that he was diagnosed with Asperger syndrome. However, Judge Gary Klausner would not allow a defense based upon the claim that Cottrell had Asperger syndrome.

At his trial, Cottrell admitted being present, but denied involvement in throwing Molotov cocktails, saying Johnson was the mastermind.

An informal network of Cottrell supporters formed, led by the Earth Liberation Front Prisoner's Network and the Free Billy Cottrell organization. These supporters claimed that Cottrell was the innocent victim of government persecution. However, when Cottrell named Johnson as the mastermind, it prompted his Free Billy Cottrell supporters to brand him as a traitor, issue an apology to those who supported Cottrell, and end all support.

Imprisonment
An article in the LA Weekly reports that Billy was being mistreated by prison guards who have labeled him a "terrorist".  According to the article, he is not permitted to study physics or Mandarin Chinese, is not permitted to teach the other prisoners calculus, and had had his books and papers removed without being given a reason.

A letter in Cottrell's defense, signed by Stephen Hawking and other prominent scientists, was distributed to prison authorities and the U.S. 9th Circuit Court of Appeals at Cottrell's October 18, 2006 hearing. He was then transferred into another federal prison with less violent prisoners. Cottrell was then able to study subjects that he was denied at the last prison and no longer had a roommate.

Documentary film

A documentary film on Cottrell, titled Standard Deviation, was written and directed by David Randag and Chris Brannan in 2008. In 2009, it won the Emmy for best student documentary at the Academy of Television Arts & Sciences Foundation's 30th College Television Awards.

Decision by the U.S. Court of Appeals Ninth Circuit
On 8 September 2009, Cottrell's convictions and sentences for arson were overturned  by the 9th U.S. Circuit Court of Appeals.  However, the conspiracy conviction and sentence were affirmed. According to the Times, the omission of Cottrell's diagnosis of Asperger syndrome during his 2004 trial played a key role in the decision. Cottrell was released on August 16, 2011. After his release from prison he completed his PhD in theoretical and mathematical physics at the University of Wisconsin Madison and postdoctorate research at University of Amsterdam and Stanford University.

References

External links
 

1980 births
American people convicted of arson
American prisoners and detainees
Earth Liberation Front
Living people
People from Concord, North Carolina
People with Asperger syndrome
Prisoners and detainees of the United States federal government
United States Court of Appeals for the Ninth Circuit cases
University of Chicago alumni